Bright Lights, Red Eyes is the third extended play (EP) by Australian singer-songwriter Ruel. The EP was released on 23 October 2020 through RCA Records.

The EP was written in June 2019 in a Airbnb mansion in Paris, France. Ruel said "You can actually see it in the cover art – it's me and Sarah Aarons outside it" adding "We wrote five songs in about three days, each in under an hour."

In a press release in October 2020, Ruel said "I want to get across that this project is another step forward in maturity for me. This project was a stream of consciousness when I was writing it at the time, and I feel like that's the way all projects and songs are for me. They are moments in time. This project isn't who I am right now as I wrote these songs last year, but it's the most mature you've ever heard me and it was me, in that moment in time."

Reception
In the week of its released, the EP was ToneDeaf's record of the week. Geordie Gray said "It's a delightful collection of fluttery, perfectly-crafted pop tracks. The neo-soul Cautious Clay collaboration 'Say it Over' is a real highlight" while Alexander Pan said "Bright Lights, Bright Eyes is easily Ruel's most mature collection of songs to date. With his pop sound more polished and those vocals more emotional as ever, Ruel's new EP shows just why he's one of the most promising artists today."

Track listing

Charts

References

2020 EPs
Ruel (singer) EPs